The Women's 4x100m Medley Relay event at the 2003 Pan American Games took place on August 16, 2003 (Day 15 of the Games).

Medalists

Records

Results

Notes

References
2003 Pan American Games Results: Day 15, CBC online; retrieved 2009-06-13.
swimmers-world

Medley, Women's Relay 4x100m
2003 in women's swimming
Swim